Vadim Vasilyevich Borisovsky (20 January 1900 – 2 July 1972) was a Soviet and Russian violist.

Biography 
Born in Moscow, Borisovsky entered Moscow Conservatory in 1917 studying the violin with Mikhail Press. A year later, on the advice of violist Vladimir Bakaleinikov, Borisovsky turned his attentions to the viola. He studied with Bakaleinikov and graduated in 1922. Borisovsky became Professor of Viola at the conservatory in 1925

Between 1922 and 1923, Borisovsky and colleagues from the Moscow Conservatory formed the Beethoven Quartet. He was the quartet's violist until 1964. There are many recordings of Borisovsky with the Beethoven Quartet.

Borisovsky was also a viola d'amore player. He arranged, transcribed and edited more than 250 compositions for viola and viola d'amore.

He died in Moscow, aged 72.

Original compositions 
 Concert Etude (Концертный этюд) in A major for viola solo (published 1981)
 Vulcan: Sicilian Tarantella (Сицилийская тарантелла “Вулкан”) for viola and piano (1962)

Arrangements and transcriptions

Harp 
For harp solo

Viola d'amore 
For viola d'amore and piano unless otherwise noted

Viola 
For viola and piano unless otherwise noted

1900 births
1972 deaths
20th-century classical musicians
20th-century Russian male musicians
Moscow Conservatory alumni
Academic staff of Moscow Conservatory
People's Artists of the RSFSR
Stalin Prize winners
Recipients of the Order of the Red Banner of Labour
Russian classical viola d'amore players
Russian classical violists
Soviet classical viola d'amore players
Soviet classical violists